Tunbridge Grammar School may refer, at different periods, to:

Tonbridge School  
Tonbridge Grammar School
Tunbridge Wells Grammar School for Boys
Tunbridge Wells Girls' Grammar School